Goose Van Schaick (September 5, 1736 – July 4, 1789) was a Continental Army officer during the American Revolutionary War.

Early life
Van Schaick was born in Albany on September 5, 1736.  He was the first child born to Sybrant Van Schaick, who served as Mayor of Albany, New York from 1756 to 1761, and Alida (née Rosebloom) Van Schaick.

His paternal grandparents were Albany trader and landholder Gosen Van Schaick and Catharina (née Staats) Van Schaick.  Goose's cousin Catherine (née Van Schaick) Gansevoort and her husband Peter Gansevoort, the Sheriff of Albany County, were the grandparents of author Herman Melville.

Career
In 1758, he was a captain of a New York regiment that participated in the attack on Fort Frontenac and Fort Niagara during the French and Indian War. From 1760 to 1762, he was lieutenant colonel of first the 2nd regiment of New York Provincials and then later the 1st regiment of New York Provincials.

On June 28, 1775 he was commissioned as colonel of the 2nd New York Regiment. On March 8, 1776 he was made colonel of the 1st New York Regiment. On July 6, 1777, he was wounded at the Siege of Fort Ticonderoga. He served under Gen. William Alexander at the Battle of Monmouth. 

He is most famous for his April 1779 expedition against the Onondaga Indians, starting from Fort Stanwix.  His force of 558 troops attacked and burned their principal settlement together with provisions and stores, killed their cattle, and took 32 prisoners without a loss of a single man. On May 10, 1779, an act of the Continental Congress: "Resolved, that the thanks of Congress be presented to Colonel Van Schaick and the officers and soldiers under his command, for their activity and good conduct in the late expedition against the Onondagas". At the time, the expedition was considered to be more effectual than the soon-following Sullivan Expedition.

He was appointed brevet brigadier general on October 10, 1783, and he served until November 1783.

Personal life
On November 15, 1770, Van Schaick was married to Maria Ten Broeck (1750–1829), the eldest of ten daughters born to John Tobias Ten Broeck. By 1787, they were the parents of seven children, including:

 Alida Van Schaick (b. 1771)
 John Van Schaick (b. 1774)
 Sybrant Van Schaick (b. 1776)
 Tobias Van Schaick (b. 1779), who married Jane Staats (1783–1823), daughter of merchant Henry Staats in 1811.
 Myndert Van Schaick (1782–1865), who was a New York State Senator.
 Elizabeth Van Schaick (1786–1786), who died young.
 Abraham Van Schaick (b. 1787).

He died at his home on July 4, 1789, of cancer of his facial wound received in the battle of Fort Ticonderoga of 1758.  The site of his burial is unclear.  It appears he was buried in the family cemetery on Court St. in Albany until 1808, when he was reinterred in the Reformed Dutch Burial Grounds.  Graves from the Dutch Cemetery were later reinterred in the Church Section of the Albany Rural Cemetery.

References

External links
 Colonel Van Schaick Biography at the New York State Museum

1736 births
1789 deaths
British military personnel of the French and Indian War
Continental Army officers from New York (state)
American people of Dutch descent
Military personnel from Albany, New York